Bernd Riede is a German music educator, author of several textbooks and director of studies at the  in the Reinickendorf borough of Berlin.

Life 
Riede studied school music, musicology, political science, philosophy and Italian. In 1985 he was awarded a doctorate at the Free University of Berlin with a thesis on Luigi Nono in musicology. He was a teacher and from 1992 to 2018 head of the music department at the Friedrich-Engels-Gymnasium Berlin-Reinickendorf.

Since 1980 he has also been teaching music theory at universities. Since 1993 he has been a member of framework plan commissions several times. His texts for music lessons, especially in the upper school, are used nationwide.

Publications 
 Luigi Nonos Kompositionen mit Tonband: Ästhetik des musikalischen Materials - Werkanalysen - Werkverzeichnis. Dissertation. Musikverlag Katzbichler, Munich 1986, .
 Luigi Nonos politisch engagierte Werke im Musikunterricht heute. In Ulrich Prinz, Bernd Sunten (edit.): Materialien für den Musikunterricht in der Oberstufe. Volume 3: Musik im 20. Jahrhundert. Klett, Schroedel, Stuttgart 1994, . (online)
 Schadet Musik? - Über einige negative Aspekte der Musik in unserer Gesellschaft. In Universitas 12/1994. Wissenschaftliche Verlagsgesellschaft, Stuttgart 1994.
 with Andreas Otto: Songbuch. Volk und Wissen, Berlin 1997, .
 Vorbereitung auf das Abitur - Musiktheorie. Manz, Munich 1998, .
 Vorbereitung auf das Abitur - Musikgeschichte bis 1900. Manz, Stuttgart 1999, .
 Vorbereitung auf das Abitur - Musikgeschichte des 20. Jahrhunderts. Manz, Stuttgart 2000, .
 Orbis musicus : für die Oberstufe ; wir erfinden Musik. Buchner, Bamberg 2003, .
 Orbis musicus (Lehrerband) : für die Oberstufe ; wir erfinden Musik. Buchner, Bamberg 2004, .
 Songbuch. Cornelsen, Berlin 2012, .

References 

German music educators
Date of birth missing (living people)
Living people
Place of birth missing (living people)
Year of birth missing (living people)